The Atherton scrubwren (Sericornis keri) is a bird species. Placed in the family Pardalotidae in the Sibley-Ahlquist taxonomy, this has met with opposition and indeed is now known to be wrong; they rather belong to the independent family Acanthizidae.

It is endemic to Queensland (south-eastern coasts of Cape York Peninsula). Its natural habitats are subtropical or tropical moist lowland forests and subtropical or tropical moist montane forests.

References

Sericornis
Birds of Queensland
Endemic birds of Australia
Atherton scrubwren
Taxonomy articles created by Polbot